Hrvatska radiotelevizija (abbr. HRT), or Croatian Radiotelevision, is Croatia's public broadcasting company. It operates several radio and television channels, over a domestic transmitter network as well as satellite. HRT is divided into three joint companies – Croatian Radio, Croatian Television and Music Production, which includes three orchestras (Symphony, Jazz and Tamburitza) and a choir.

The founder of HRT is the Republic of Croatia which exercises its founder's rights through the Croatian Government. Croatian Radio (then Radio Zagreb) was founded on 15 May 1926. This date is considered the date on which HRT was founded. Television Zagreb (today Croatian Television) began broadcasting on 7 September 1956. By the law enacted by the Croatian Parliament on 29 June 1990, Radio Television Zagreb was renamed to Croatian Radiotelevision.

HRT operates as a provider of public broadcasting services, and Croatia provides independent funding in accordance with the Croatian Broadcasting Company Law and the State Aid Rules for Public Broadcasting Services. In carrying out its activities, HRT is independent of any political influence and commercial interest.

On 25 May 2012, HRT's archive of the television and radio program and its collection of musical production were given the status of Croatian cultural heritage.

History

Croatian Radiotelevision is the direct successor of Radio Station Zagreb that started broadcasting on 15 May 1926, the first radio station to broadcast in the Balkans. The station was initially a private company, before Radio Zagreb was nationalized on 1 May 1940. During the Independent State of Croatia, the station was known as Hrvatski krugoval. After World War II, it began to operate as a state-owned radio station.

At the end of the first year of operation, Radio Zagreb company had a little over four thousand subscribers.

On the 30th anniversary of the establishment of Zagreb Radio Station, on 15 May 1956, the first television programme was broadcast from the transmitter built at Sljeme. Television Zagreb's first live broadcast aired on 7 September 1956. For the next two years this was the only television broadcasting service in the southeast European area. This was the first TV station in Yugoslavia and would later become a color station in 1972.

In May 1990, following Franjo Tuđman's election victory, he and his ruling Croatian Democratic Union party began a takeover of radio and television stations. In June 1990, the Croatian Parliament renamed the company from Radio Television Zagreb to Croatian Radiotelevision. The HDZ-majority Croatian Parliament soon appointed party loyalists to top managerial and editorial positions on the broadcaster. 

The film director Antun Vrdoljak, a Tuđman appointee who was tasked with overseeing the changes, pledged to make HRT into the "cathedral of the Croatian spirit". On 16 September 1991, 300 employees at HRT were fired for "security reasons". According to Miljenko Jergović, formerly of the Croatian independent Feral Tribune, there were three waves of purges at HRT at this time: removal of Serb journalists; removal of "independent-minded, respected and thus dangerous" journalists; and slowly, the removal of those who did not support ultranationalism any longer.

On 1 January 1993, HRT was admitted as a full active member of the European Broadcasting Union (EBU).

The television channels were aired under the name Croatian Television between 1990 and 1993. Since then, the current name has been used. The radio broadcast unit is referred to as Croatian Radio.

Following Tuđman's death and the 2000 election in Croatia which brought Stjepan Mesić to power, attempts at reforming HRT into a more open media were made.

Funding 
In 2014, more than 85% of HRT's revenue came from broadcast user fees with each household in Croatia required to pay 79 HRK (~€10) per month for a single television set, with the remainder being made up from limited advertising.

Television

Channels
 HRT 1 (or Prvi program): HRT's first TV channel, previously known as TVZ 1. This is a general channel with daily news around the world, documentaries, religious programmes, series and movies.
 HRT 2 (or Drugi program): HRT's second channel, previously known as TVZ 2. It is primarily used for sports broadcasts and entertainment programmes. The channel is known for its extensive footage of vintage films. It also broadcasts educational programmes.
 HRT 3 (or Treći program): HRT's third channel, primarily used for culture, films and documentaries. It launched in September 2012.
 HRT 4 (or Četvrti program): HRT's fourth channel, broadcasting news programmes, started airing in December 2012.
 , formerly HRT 5 (or Peti program): HRT's fifth and international channel, broadcasting a wide range of programmes from its domestic channels for the Croatian diasporas in Europe, North America, Australia and New Zealand.

In the 1980s, there was a third channel called Z3 and later HTV Z3. It was taken off-air on 16 September 1991 when its main transmitter, the Sljeme TV tower, was damaged in an air raid. On 7 November 1994, the channel came back on the air, this time called HRT 3. The channel was later shut down with its frequency de-nationalized and put up for lease in a public tender in 2004 and it has been used by RTL Televizija ever since.

Regional TV channels
 HRT Čakovec-Varaždin  (HRT regionalni centar Čakovec-Varaždin)
 HRT Osijek  (HRT regionalni centar Osijek)
 HRT Rijeka-Pula  (HRT regionalni centar Rijeka-Pula)
 HRT Split-Dubrovnik  (HRT regionalni centar Split-Dubrovnik)
 HRT Zadar-Šibenik-Knin  (HRT regionalni centar Zadar-Šibenik-Knin)

Programming
 
 

 Dnevnik HRT ("Daily News"), popular midday, evening and midnight news program
 Dobro jutro, Hrvatska ("Good Morning, Croatia"), mosaic morning show from 7:00 to 9:00 am
 Dobar dan, Hrvatska ("Good Afternoon, Croatia"), mosaic afternoon show
 Nedjeljom u dva ("Sundays at Two O'Clock"), weekly talk show
 Transfer ("Transfer"), show about the alternative culture and arts (visual arts, music and web culture)
 TV kalendar ("TV Calendar"), long-running daily historical documentary television series, narrating about historical events, birth/death of people or their discoveries on the same date
 Tko želi biti milijunaš? ("Who Wants to Be a Millionaire?"), quiz show
 Zvijezde pjevaju ("Just the Two of Us"), big Saturday singing show
 Lijepom Našom ("Our Beautiful"), a show focused on Croatian cultural heritage
 Otvoreno ("Openly"), daily political talk-show

Former shows
 Dan za danom ("Day After Day"), mosaic afternoon show
 Kviskoteka (quiz show), hosted by Oliver Mlakar, aired in the 1980s and 1990s, later briefly aired on Nova TV
 Male tajne velikih majstora kuhinje ("Small Secrets of Big Chefs") (cooking show), aired in the 1980s
 Motrišta ("Points of View") (political informative magazine), aired in the 1990s
 The Pyramid, weekly show hosted by Željka Ogresta, winner of Rose d'Or, aired 2004–2008; 2014
 Slika na sliku ("Frame On Frame") (political magazine), aired in the 1990s
 Upitnik ("Question Mark") (quiz show), hosted by Joško Lokas, aired in the 2000s, later briefly aired on Nova TV, taken off-air in 2004
 Turbo Limač Show (kids' Saturday show), hosted by Siniša Cmrk
 Željka Ogresta i gosti ("Željka Ogresta and Guests") (talk show), aired in the start of the 1990s and in the start of the 2000s
 Ples sa zvijezdama ("Dancing with the Stars"), Saturday dancing show

Upcoming shows
 Big Saturday Live, Saturday night show
 Dancing on Ice
 Friends, children's Sunday program
 School work, educational school morning magazine
 Sunday Afternoon
 Talks with Coffee, talk show
 Pinkalicious & Peterrific, children’s Monday-Thursday program
 Clifford the Big Red Dog, children Sunday program

Radio

The Croatian Radio (Hrvatski radio) runs three national and eight local (county-level) stations.

National stations
The three national stations are available on FM, DAB+, throughout the country and are streamed live via the Internet.

HR 1 – The primary national-level station, mainly serious programming. News every full hour with oldies and local pop music.
HR 2 – Entertainment programming including popular music, with news followed by traffic reports at the half-hour mark
HR 3 – Classical music and radio drama

Regional stations
HR Dubrovnik – based in Dubrovnik, covers the Dubrovnik-Neretva County
HR Knin – based in Knin, covers the Šibenik-Knin County
HR Osijek – based in Osijek, covers the Osijek-Baranja County
HR Pula – based in Pula, covers the Istria County
HR Rijeka – based in Rijeka, covers the Primorje-Gorski Kotar County
HR Sljeme – based in Zagreb, covers the city and the counties of the Northern Croatia
HR Split – based in Split, covers the Split-Dalmatia County
HR Zadar – based in Zadar, covers the Zadar County

The mediumwave transmitter at Zadar was at one time one of the most powerful in Europe and at nighttime could be heard throughout most of the continent with JRT (Yugoslav) and later HR (Croatian) programming from Zagreb and Pula. However it was badly damaged during the Serbian shelling of the city in the early 1990s, and has operated on somewhat reduced power since on 1134 kHz. Transmitter was rebuilt in 2004. It consists of 4 masts, every is 132 meters high. It was taken off the air on 1 January 2014.

International service
Voice of Croatia (Glas Hrvatske): Airs programming for Croatians living abroad, Croatia's minority groups and the international community. While mostly in Croatian, the station also features short news and segments in English, German, Italian, Hungarian, and Spanish at different times of the day.

The Voice of Croatia broadcasts 24 hours a day via the following satellites; in Europe, North Africa, the Middle East on the Eutelsat 13C at 13°E and Eutelsat 16A at 16 degrees east for Central and East Europe.

Logos

See also
Radio in Croatia
Television in Croatia

References

Books

External links

 
Zakon o Hrvatskoj radioteleviziji  (Croatian Radiotelevision Act)

1926 establishments in Croatia
Publicly funded broadcasters
Radio stations in Croatia
Television networks in Croatia
European Broadcasting Union members
Multilingual broadcasters
Radio stations established in 1926
Television channels and stations established in 1956
State media
Government-owned companies of Croatia
Companies based in Zagreb
Modern history of Croatia
Croatian news websites